Foysol Hussain Choudhury, MBE (born 5 January 1969) is a Bangladeshi-born British businessman, and a Scottish Labour politician.  He has been a Member of the Scottish Parliament (MSP) for the Lothian region since May 2021.

Choudhury is Chairman of the Edinburgh and Lothians Regional Equality Council. He is one of the founding directors and the Vice Chair of the Edinburgh Mela. He is also Chairman of the Bangladesh Samity Edinburgh.

Early life
Choudhury was born in the village of Badardi, Bausha Union, Nabiganj, Habiganj, Sylhet District, East Pakistan (now Bangladesh), and grew up in Edinburgh, Scotland.

Choudhury's parents are the late Al-Haj Gulam Rabbani Choudhury and Rukeya Rabbani Choudhury. He is eldest of six siblings, he has one brother and five sisters. In 1982, his father came and settled in Edinburgh. Choudhury's uncle is businessman Wali Tasar Uddin.

Career
During his time studying at the University of Edinburgh, Choudhury took responsibility for his ailing father's business. He expanded the business and is now an entrepreneur with interests in catering, hospitality, finance and real estate across the United Kingdom and Bangladesh.

Choudhury is a community activist in the UK. He has worked with the Scottish Government and various councils to improve community relations. He has played a leading role in several charities.

He has been involved with the Edinburgh and Lothian's Regional Equality Council (ELREC) since he was a teenager and has been an active campaigner for equality and good race and interfaith relations in Scotland. He has served the ELREC as a Trustee, company secretary, Vice Chair and he is currently its chairman. Choudhury has led the organisation through its transition from the race equality council to a pan-equalities regional council. In 2013, he was re-elected for a fourth term.

In 1991, Choudhury co-founded the Edinburgh Mela and is currently its vice-chair. In 2010, he was elected as the Chairman of the Bangladesh Samity Edinburgh (Bangladesh Association Edinburgh). He has organised, annually, Bangladesh Independence Day Celebrations and other events to promote strong community relations. Choudhury is the Chairman of the Guild of Bangladeshi Restaurateurs of Scotland and as one of the founding members of Dine Bangladeshi Campaign.

At the snap 2017 general election, Choudhury was selected as the official Labour Party candidate for the Edinburgh South West constituency. However, he was not elected and finished in third place with 13,213 votes.

He was elected at 2021 Scottish Parliament election for the Lothian region, becoming the first MSP of Bangladeshi background to be elected.

Criticism
On 11 June 2019, an article in the Edinburgh Evening News reported criticism of Mr Choudhury by an employment tribunal. The tribunal, brought by former Mela director Chris Purnell, found that evidence given by Mr Choudhury was unsatisfactory. The tribunal said Mr Purnell had given his evidence “in a straightforward and measured way” and it was “entirely credible”. It added: “In contrast, the manner in which Mr Khan and Mr Choudhury gave their evidence was often unsatisfactory. Both showed a reluctance to answer simple questions directly.”

The tribunal awarded Mr Purnell £67,000 after it found he was unfairly dismissed from his role of director of the Mela festival, of which Mr Choudhury was vice-chair. Mr Purnell alleged that Mr Choudhury told him he should “watch himself” and “remember who pays his wages”. And he said Mr Choudhury also criticised his body language and told him “directors come and go” and that he should not be taking credit for the success of the Mela and “acting as if he was doing the board a favour”.

The 2016 Mela was cancelled but the festival went ahead in scaled-back form in 2017 and 2018. The council has invited tenders to run a multicultural event in the summer of 2019.

Choudhury also faced some criticism for benefitting from the zipping system of candidate ranking. The system is intended to promote female candidates by alternating between male and female candidates. In the Lothian region selection ballot Choudhury finished in fifth place but thanks to the zipping system was promoted to third place ahead of two female candidates who achieved greater support.

Awards and recognition
In 2004, Choudhury was appointed a Member of the Order of the British Empire (MBE) in the 2004 New Year Honours for his services to the community. In 2006, he was awarded from the Channel S Award for his outstanding role as community worker and leader.

Personal life
Choudhury is married Tahmina (Moni) Choudhury.

He is involved in fundraising campaigns, raising over £250,000 for causes including Bangladesh Cyclone Appeal in Scotland, St Colombia's Hospice, Leukaemia and Cancer appeal, Sick Kids appeal, the British Heart Foundation and many others. In addition to this he is also one of the organisers who built two shelter and 40 houses for the survivors of Cyclone Sidr Bangladesh in 2010.

See also
 British Bangladeshis
 List of British Bangladeshis

References

External links 
 

1969 births
Living people
British Muslims
Bangladeshi emigrants to England
British people of Bangladeshi descent
Naturalised citizens of the United Kingdom
British activists
British restaurateurs
Scottish Labour parliamentary candidates
People from Nabiganj Upazila
Businesspeople from Edinburgh
Alumni of the University of Edinburgh
Members of the Order of the British Empire
British politicians of Bangladeshi descent
Labour MSPs
Members of the Scottish Parliament 2021–2026